Burrard Generating Station was a natural gas-fired station built by BC Electric, owned by BC Hydro since 1961, located in Port Moody, British Columbia, Canada.

Description 

The station originally consisted of six 160 MW units; it served to meet short term peak demands. Three units were held in standby, available on eight hours' notice. The three active units were used for voltage regulation. A plant upgrade project was completed in 2003. In 2001 it represented over 9% of BC Hydro's gross metered generation.

BC Hydro shut down the station in 2016 after the completion of enough replacement capacity at the Mica Generating Station.

See also 

 BC Hydro

References

Buildings and structures in Port Moody
Natural gas-fired power stations in British Columbia
1962 establishments in British Columbia
Energy infrastructure completed in 1962
BC Hydro